Fantastic Comics was an American comic book superhero anthology title published by Fox Feature Syndicate during the Golden Age of Comic Books. The title introduced the characters Banshee, Black Fury (John Perry), Nagana, Queen of Evil, Samson, and Stardust the Super Wizard.

Publication history
The first issue is cover-dated December 1939. Fantastic Comics continued to run until issue #23 in November 1941.

Most of the characters appearing in Fantastic Comics eventually fell into the public domain. In 2008, as part of the Next Issue Project, Image Comics revived the title with a single issue, "#24". This issue features the following characters:
 Samson, written and illustrated by Alex Boon
 Flip Falcon, written by Joe Casey and illustrated by Bill Sienkiewicz
 Golden Knight, co-written and illustrated by Thomas Yeates and Bryan Rutherford
 Yank Wilson, written and illustrated by Andy Kuhn
 Space Smith, written and illustrated by Tom Scioli
 Captain Kidd, written and illustrated by Jim Rugg
 Professor Fiend, written and illustrated by Fred Hembeck
 Sub Saunders, written and illustrated by Ashley Wood
 Stardust the Super Wizard, written by Joe Keatinge and illustrated by Mike Allred
 A prose piece featuring Carlton Riggs by B. Clayton Moore with illustration by Jason Latour

References

External links

Comics magazines published in the United States
Magazines established in 1939
Magazines disestablished in 1941
Superhero comics
1939 comics debuts
1941 comics endings
Defunct American comics
Magazines about comics
Golden Age comics titles